The 1980 Canadian Grand Prix was a Formula One motor race held on 28 September 1980, at the Circuit Île Notre-Dame in Montreal, Quebec, Canada. It was the thirteenth and penultimate race of the 1980 Formula One season. The race was the 19th Canadian Grand Prix and the third to be held in Montreal. The race was held over 70 laps of the 4.41-kilometre circuit for a total race distance of 309 kilometres.

Australian driver Alan Jones, driving a Williams FW07B, won his second consecutive Canadian Grand Prix, and coupled with the retirement of the Brabham BT49 of Brazilian driver Nelson Piquet due to the failure of its Cosworth DFV engine, this allowed Jones to secure the 1980 World Drivers' Championship. Jones became only the second Australian to claim the world championship, a title last won by Jack Brabham in 1966. It was also the first World Drivers' Championship for Williams Grand Prix Engineering, adding to their first Constructors' Championship, achieved two weeks earlier at the Italian Grand Prix. The race featured a controversial first start where Piquet and Jones raced side by side to the first corner and touched, causing Piquet to hit the wall, sparking off other accidents behind. Piquet was forced to restart in his more fragile qualifying car, which ultimately led to his retirement and the end of the title battle. Some commentators thought Jones had forced Piquet into the wall, but the Brazilian shrugged it off as a racing incident. 

The brief comeback of Vittorio Brambilla had come to an end with the Italian veteran retiring from Formula One. Alfa Romeo replaced him with someone younger and Andrea de Cesaris made his Grand Prix debut, as did teenage New Zealander Mike Thackwell. Thackwell stepped aboard a third Tyrrell 010 breaking the record as the youngest ever driver to start a Grand Prix, a record held for 19 years by the late Mexican teenager Ricardo Rodríguez. The record would stand for 29 years until broken by Jaime Alguersuari in 2009.

First and second in the championship were decided with the 1980 United States Grand Prix still to come. Jones led Piquet by 8 points but Piquet had already had five points-scoring finishes in the second half of the season. If Piquet won at Watkins Glen he would have to drop the two points from his fifth-place finish in Austria, leaving him one point behind Jones even if Jones failed to finish. Third place in the championship was theoretically open with Laffite eight points behind Reutemann. Second place in the constructors' championship was still open with Brabham just five points behind Ligier.

Qualifying

Qualifying classification

Race 
Piquet qualified on pole from Jones but used a car in fragile qualifying specification to do it. At the start Jones outlaunched Piquet but the pair refused to compromise at the first turn and the two touched, triggering a multi-car pile-up. The collision involved Jean-Pierre Jarier (Tyrrell 010), Derek Daly (Tyrrell 010), Emerson Fittipaldi (Fittipaldi F8), Keke Rosberg (Fittipaldi F8), Mario Andretti (Lotus 81), Gilles Villeneuve (Ferrari 312T5) and Jochen Mass (Arrows A3). Piquet, Fittipaldi, Villeneuve, Andretti and Mass restarted in spare cars, in Piquet's case his fragile qualifying car and Rosberg had his car repaired. Daly was out as was Thackwell as Jarier commandeered his Tyrrell 010. At the restart Jones led before a storming Piquet took the lead until his qualifying specification Cosworth DFV inevitably failed. Two laps later and Jean-Pierre Jabouille crashed his Renault RE20 heavily, seriously injuring his legs. Jabouille had to be cut from the car.

Jones took up the lead again until Pironi forced his way into a lead which was clouded over a jumped start for which he was eventually assigned a 60-second penalty. Pironi took the chequer but would be classified third behind Jones and Reutemann. Alain Prost could have been third or even second until a suspension failure saw his McLaren M30 crash. Watson was ahead of Reutemann as well when he spun and finished fourth in his McLaren. Local hero Villeneuve claimed fifth for Ferrari on a dismal weekend that saw outgoing World Champion Jody Scheckter fail to qualify his Ferrari 312T5. The final point was claimed by Héctor Rebaque in his Brabham BT49 as Jacques Laffite ran out of fuel in his Ligier JS11/15 in the closing stages.

Race classification

Championship standings after the race 

Drivers' Championship standings

Constructors' Championship standings

Note: Only the top five positions are included for both sets of standings. Only the best 5 results from the first 7 races and the best 5 results from the last 7 races counted towards the Drivers' Championship. If different to Championship points, total points scored are shown in parentheses.

References 

Canadian Grand Prix
Canadian Grand Prix
Grand Prix
Grand Prix